Legion is a supervillain in the DC Comics universe. He was created by Keith Giffen, Gerard Jones, and Romeo Tanghal. He is a foe of Abin Sur, the Green Lantern of Sector 2814, the Silver Age Green Lantern and the Green Lantern Corps. His only appearance is in the 1990 mini-series Green Lantern: Emerald Dawn.

Fictional character biography
Legion was introduced in the 1990 comic mini-series Green Lantern: Emerald Dawn, which covers the early days of Hal Jordan's career as the Silver Age Green Lantern.

In ancient times, the Green Lantern Corps came across the planet Tchk-Tchk in Space Sector 407, which was home to an aggressive, insectile race. After conquering their own planet, they began to spread to the rest of the galaxy, at which point the Guardians of the Universe decided to take action, sending the Green Lanterns to beat back the Tchk-Tchk and seal off their planet.

Unable to leave, the Tchk-Tchk quickly expended their food supply and began to die out. Realizing what was happening, they put their minds into their new invention, the Soul Jar, wherein they became a sort of hive mind. Once all the remaining minds had entered, they built themselves a new body and called themselves Legion.

Quickly discovering that he was powerful enough to break through the Lantern's barrier, Legion set out to exact revenge on the Guardians. It managed to kill the Lanterns of Space Sectors 2817, 2816, and 2815 before encountering Abin Sur. The Lantern was unable to harm Legion due to his yellow color, but did manage to escape the encounter.

Following Abin Sur's energy trail, Legion found himself on Earth where, upon learning of Abin Sur's death, he set out to kill his replacement, Hal Jordan.

When he found Jordan, his ring was depleted, thus leading Legion to believe he had lost the trail. In a rage, he destroyed everywhere the ring had been. Jordan took the opportunity to go to Abin Sur's spaceship to recharge his ring, which again attracted Legion. Jordan detonated the ships reactors, using his ring to protect himself, and afterwards believed Legion to be dead.

However, Legion had escaped to the moon to continue his vendetta. When Jordan was taken to be trained by Kilowog, Legion went to Oa for a final assault on the Guardians. He easily broke through their defenses, and Jordan and Kilowog were forced to assist in Oa's defense. Nothing seemed able to stop him, and many Lanterns were killed. He reached the Guardian's citadel, but Jordan, thinking quickly, covered him with mud (so his ring could affect him) and shattered his armor, believing this would kill him. Instead, its consciousness absorbed the power of Oa and grew to immense proportions.

The Guardians fled Oa, but Jordan stayed to confront Legion. He hurled himself into the Central Power Battery, gaining immense power, and was able to hurl Legion into space, where the other Green Lanterns took him back to Tchk-Tchk to hopefully begin a new life.

Legion made no further appearances following the series and has been retconned out of DC comics continuity following the events of Infinite Crisis and the Sinestro Corps War (as explained in the "Secret Origin" arc of Green Lantern [Vol. 4]).

In other media
Legion was planned to be the main villain in an unproduced screenplay for a Green Lantern film written by Robert Smigel.

References

External links
 Legion at the Unofficial Guide to the DC Universe

DC Comics aliens
DC Comics male supervillains
Characters created by Keith Giffen
Fictional giants
DC Comics characters with superhuman strength
DC Comics extraterrestrial supervillains
Fictional serial killers
Comics characters introduced in 1990